Gyulay (pronounced ) is a surname of Hungarian origin. People bearing this surname are found in all parts of the world, but predominantly reside in Hungary. People with the name Gyulay include:

Counts of Gyulay 
 Count Gyulay of Maros-Némethi and Mádaska
 Gyulay Ferenc (1674–1728) (hu)
 Sámuel Gyulay (1723–1802) (hu)
 Albert Gyulai (1766–1836), son of Samuel (hu)
 Ignaz Gyulai (1763–1831), son of Samuel (hu)
 Ferenc (József) Gyulay (1798–1868) son of Ignaz (hu)

Other people 
 Endre Gyulay (born 1930) (hu)
 István Gyulay (born ?), Hungarian sprint canoer
 Zsolt Gyulay (born 1964, Vác), Hungarian sprint canoer
 Joseph Michael Gyulay (born 1957), Hungarian-American philanthropist and founder of Hesperina Group Asia

See also 
 Gyulai
 List of titled noble families in the Kingdom of Hungary

References

 

Hungarian-language surnames
Hungarian noble families